The Tupolev Tu-82 was a 1940s Soviet experimental swept-wing bomber. It was the first Soviet jet bomber with swept wings.

Design and development
Similar to the earlier Tupolev Tu-14, the Tu-82 was designed to investigate the use of swept wings. Powered by two Klimov VK-1 engines, the Tu-82 first flew in February 1949. It achieved a top speed of 934 km/h and a ceiling of 14,000 m. Tupolev planned a larger combat version as the Tu-86, but it was not built.

Specifications (Tu-82)

See also

References

Notes

Bibliography
 
 
 
 

Tu-0082
1940s Soviet bomber aircraft
Twinjets
Aircraft first flown in 1949